General Stuart may refer to:

Charles Stuart (British Army officer, born 1753) (1753–1801), British Army lieutenant general
Charles Stuart (British Army officer, born 1810) (1810–1892), British Army general
Charles Stuart (East India Company officer) (c. 1758–1828), East India Company major general
J. E. B. Stuart (1833–1864), Confederate States Army major general
James Stuart (British Army officer, born 1741) (1741–1815), British Army general
James Stuart (British Army officer, died 1793), British Army major general
John Stuart (British Army officer, born 1811) (1811–1889), British Army general
Kenneth Stuart (1891–1945), Canadian Army  lieutenant general
Simon Stuart (general) (fl. 1990s–2020s), Australian Army major general
William Stuart (British Army officer) (1778–1837), British Army lieutenant general
James Fitz-James Stuart, 2nd Duke of Berwick (1696–1738), Spanish Royal Armies lieutenant general

See also
John Burnett-Stuart (1875–1958), British Army general
General Steuart (disambiguation)
General Stewart (disambiguation)